Phil Ryan may refer to:

Phil Ryan (entrepreneur), English musician and early founder of The Big Issue
Phil Ryan (footballer, born 1915) (1915–2014), Australian rules football player and administrator for Hawthorn
Phil Ryan (footballer, born 1925) (1925–1982), Australian rules footballer for Collingwood
Phil Ryan (footballer, born 1951), Australian rules footballer for North Melbourne
Phil Ryan (musician) (1946–2016), Welsh musician
Phil Ryan (sheriff) (born 1945), sheriff in Texas
Philip Ryan (born 1957), Irish musician, known professionally as Philip Chevron